The Robert F. Sibert Informational Book Medal established by the Association for Library Service to Children in 2001 with support from Bound to Stay Bound Books, Inc., is awarded annually to the writer and illustrator of the most distinguished informational book published in English during the preceding year. The award is named in honor of Robert F. Sibert, the long-time President of Bound to Stay Bound Books, Inc. of Jacksonville, Illinois. ALSC administers the award.

"Informational books are defined as those written and illustrated to present, organize, and interpret documentable, factual material." Poetry and traditional literature such as folktales are not eligible but there is no other restriction (such as reference books or even nonfiction books). The book must be published originally or simultaneously in the United States and in English.

Recipients

See also

References

American Library Association awards
American children's literary awards
Awards established in 2001
English-language literary awards
Young adult literature awards
Lists of books